Albert John Pullen (November 1, 1861 – December 6, 1937) was a member of the Wisconsin State Senate.

Pullen was born in Grafton, Vermont on November 1, 1861. He attended the University of Vermont and Sewanee: The University of the South. Pullen moved to North Fond du Lac, Wisconsin, in 1900. He later became president of the local humane society. During World War I, Pullen served as an officer in the United States Army Medical Corps. He died on December 6, 1937.

Political career
Pullen was elected to the Senate in 1916. Previously, he had served as President of North Fond du Lac and of the North Fond du Lac School Board, as well as Treasurer of Fond du Lac County, Wisconsin. In 1920, he was a candidate for Lieutenant Governor of Wisconsin, losing to George Comings. Pullen was a Republican.

References

External links

1861 births
1937 deaths
People from Fond du Lac County, Wisconsin
Republican Party Wisconsin state senators
School board members in Wisconsin
Military personnel from Wisconsin
United States Army Medical Corps officers
United States Army personnel of World War I
University of Vermont alumni
Sewanee: The University of the South alumni